KDKT (1410 AM) is a radio station that serves as west central North Dakota's sports talk outlet, as KDKT Sports Radio 1410. KDKT covers a large portion of western North Dakota, including key cities such as Bismarck, Dickinson and Minot. KDKT Sports Radio 1410 also carries regional, and local sports teams from North Dakota such as the University of North Dakota, Fargo-Moorhead RedHawks, Bismarck State College, and NDHSAA prep sports. Local on-air personalities include Jeff Baranick, and Jim Kusler, who host the popular Friday Night Live program.

History and ownership
The station signed on the air in 1978 as KHOL under the ownership of Mercer Broadcasting Inc, with a country music format known as "Coal Country" which reflected the coal industry in Western North Dakota.
In 2000, the station dropped Country in favor of an adult contemporary music format. In 2006, DSN Radio acquired the station changed call letters to KDKT and flipped the format to sports, with the popular CBS Sports Radio network.

External links
KDKT official website

KDKT Flips to CBS Sports Radio

DKT
DKT
Sports radio stations in the United States
Radio stations established in 1978
1978 establishments in North Dakota
Mercer County, North Dakota